aka Tora-san Goes French is a 1973 Japanese comedy film directed by Yoji Yamada. It stars Kiyoshi Atsumi as Torajirō Kuruma (Tora-san), and Keiko Kishi as his love interest or "Madonna". Tora-san Loves an Artist is the twelfth entry in the popular, long-running Otoko wa Tsurai yo series.

Synopsis
Tora-san watches the family shop while the rest of his family takes a vacation to Kyushu. 
An old friend introduces Tora-san to his sister Ritsuko, and he promptly falls in love with her. She is an artist and has no time for Tora-san.

Cast
 Kiyoshi Atsumi as Torajirō
 Keiko Kishi as Ritsuko Yanagi
 Takehiko Maeda as Fumihiko Yanagi
 Chieko Baisho as Sakura
 Tatsuo Matsumura as Ryūzō Azuma
 Chieko Misaki as Tsune Kuruma (Torajiro's aunt)
 Gin Maeda as Hiroshi Suwa
 Hayato Nakamura as Mitsuo Suwa
 Hisao Dazai as Boss (Umetarō Katsura)
 Gajirō Satō as Genkō
 Chishū Ryū as Gozen-sama

Critical appraisal
Stuart Galbraith IV calls Tora-san Loves an Artist a "solid" entry in the series, which is "alternately sweet and touching, funny and biting." The German-language site molodezhnaja gives Tora-san Loves an Artist three and a half out of five stars.

Availability
Tora-san Loves an Artist was released theatrically on December 16, 1973. In Japan, the film was released on videotape in 1995, and in DVD format in 2008.

References

Bibliography

English

German

Japanese

External links
 Tora-san Loves an Artist at www.tora-san.jp (official site)

1973 films
Films directed by Yoji Yamada
1973 comedy films
1970s Japanese-language films
Otoko wa Tsurai yo films
Shochiku films
Films with screenplays by Yôji Yamada
Japanese sequel films
1970s Japanese films